Rosemann is a surname. Notable people with the surname include:

Rosemann of Isenburg-Kempenich, Lord of Isenburg-Kempenich co-ruling with his brothers Salentin and Theodoric II, and eventually his nephew Theodoric III
Julius Rosemann (1878–1933), German politician of the Independent Social Democratic Party
Martin Rosemann (born 1976), German politician
Michael Rosemann (born 1967), German information systems researcher, professor and Director of the Centre for Future Enterprise, QUT, Brisbane, Australia, Australia
Philipp Rosemann (born 1964), German philosopher and Professor and Chair of Philosophy at Maynooth University

See also
Roseman
Rosman (disambiguation)